Aberrantidae is a family of annelids belonging to the order Spionida.

Genera:
 Aberranta Hartman, 1965

References

Annelids